There have been three baronetcies created for people with the surname Riddell, one in the Baronetage of Nova Scotia, one in the Baronetage of Great Britain and one in the Baronetage of the United Kingdom. As of 2014 one creation is extant.

The Riddell Baronetcy, of Riddell in the County of Roxburgh, was created in the Baronetage of Nova Scotia on 14 May 1628 for John Riddell. Sir John Riddell's lands were erected into the barony and regality of New Riddell. Sir John's third son, William, was knighted by Charles I and later served in the Eighty Years' War also known as the Netherlands' War of Independence. The Reverend Archibald Riddell, the third son of the second Baronet, was a minister of the reformed church in Edinburgh who was persecuted and imprisoned because he would not renounce his Covenanter beliefs; unlike many others, however, he escaped with his life. Sir John Buchanan Riddell, MP for Selkirk, married in 1805 the eldest daughter of the Earl of Romney. In September 1998 the 13th Baronet, Sir John, was recognised by the Lord Lyon as Chief of the name. As of 28 February 2014 the present Baronet has not successfully proven his succession and is therefore not on the Official Roll of the Baronetage, with the baronetcy considered dormant since 2010.

The Riddell Baronetcy, of Ardnamurchan in the County of Argyll, was created in the Baronetage of Great Britain on 2 September 1778 for James Riddell. He was superintendent general to the Society of British Fishery and a Fellow of the Society of Arts and Sciences. Sir Rodney Riddell, the fourth and last Baronet, was a distinguished professional soldier who campaigned in New Zealand and during the Afghan War of 1878 to 1880. He died in 1907 and the title became extinct on his death.

The Riddell Baronetcy, of Walton in the County of Surrey, was created in the Baronetage of the United Kingdom on 31 January 1918 for George Allardice Riddell. Sir George was a prominent newspaper proprietor who was subsequently created Baron Riddell. Thus the baronetcy became a subsidiary title until it became extinct on his death in 1934.

Riddell baronets, of Riddell (1628)

Sir John Riddell, 1st Baronet (died 1632)
Sir Walter Riddell, 2nd Baronet (died )
Sir John Riddell, 3rd Baronet (died 1700)
Sir Walter Riddell, 4th Baronet (1664–1747)
Sir Walter Riddell, 5th Baronet (1695–1765)
Sir John Riddell, 6th Baronet (1726–1768)
Sir Walter Buchanan Riddell, 7th Baronet (1763–1784)
Sir James Buchanan Riddell, 8th Baronet (1765–1784)
Sir John Buchanan Riddell, 9th Baronet (1768–1819)
Sir Walter Buchanan Riddell, 10th Baronet (1810–1892)
Sir James Walter Buchanan Riddell, 11th Baronet (1849–1924)
Sir Walter Robert Buchanan Riddell, 12th Baronet (1879–1934)
Sir John Charles Buchanan Riddell, 13th Baronet (1934–2010)
Sir Walter John Buchanan Riddell, 14th Baronet (born 1974)

The heir apparent is the present holder's only son Finlay John Riddell (born 2001).

Riddell baronets, of Ardnamurchan (1778)

Sir James Riddell, 1st Baronet (died 1797)
Sir James Milles Riddell, 2nd Baronet (1787–1861)
Sir Thomas Miles Riddell, 3rd Baronet (1822–1883)
Sir Rodney Stuart Riddell, 4th Baronet (1838–1907)

Riddell baronets, of Walton Heath (1918)
see the Baron Riddell

References

Baronetcies in the Baronetage of Nova Scotia
Extinct baronetcies in the Baronetage of Great Britain
Extinct baronetcies in the Baronetage of the United Kingdom
1628 establishments in Nova Scotia
1778 establishments in Great Britain
1918 establishments in the United Kingdom